The Wrong Mr. Wright is a 1927 American comedy film directed by Scott Sidney and written by Harold Shumate and James Madison. It is based on the 1897 play The Wrong Mr. Wright by George Broadhurst. The film stars Jean Hersholt, Enid Bennett, Dorothy Devore, Edgar Kennedy, Walter Hiers and Robert Anderson. The film was released on February 27, 1927, by Universal Pictures.

Cast        
Jean Hersholt as Seymour White
Enid Bennett as Henrietta
Dorothy Devore as Teddy
Edgar Kennedy as Trayguard
Walter Hiers as Bond
Robert Anderson as Wright

References

External links
 

1927 films
1920s English-language films
Silent American comedy films
1927 comedy films
Universal Pictures films
Films directed by Scott Sidney
American silent feature films
American black-and-white films
1920s American films